Lisa Steane (born 21 January 1995) is an Australian rules footballer who plays for Sydney in the AFL Women's (AFLW). She previously played for Greater Western Sydney.

Early Life
Steane was born and raised in Nelson Bay, New South Wales. She played her junior football with the Nelson Bay Football Club in the AFL Hunter Central Coast competition. She moved to Sydney to pursue her dream to play AFLW.

AFLW career
In October 2019, Steane joined Greater Western Sydney. In May 2022, Steane joined expansion club and rival club Sydney.

References

External links

 

Living people
1995 births
Greater Western Sydney Giants (AFLW) players
Australian rules footballers from New South Wales
Sportswomen from New South Wales
Sydney Swans (AFLW) players